is a private university in Aoba-ku, Yokohama, Kanagawa Prefecture, Japan. In 2009, the university was reorganized from a two-year college to a four-year university.
Originally established in 1966 as a women's junior college.

External links
 Official website 

Educational institutions established in 2010
Private universities and colleges in Japan
Universities and colleges in Yokohama
Western Metropolitan Area University Association
2010 establishments in Japan